Dr. Francisco Tomé da Frota Airport , is the airport serving Iguatu, Brazil.

Airlines and destinations

Access

See also

List of airports in Brazil

References

External links

Airports in Ceará